Amblispa dohrnii, is a species of leaf beetle found in Sri Lanka.

References 

Cassidinae
Insects of Sri Lanka
Beetles described in 1858